Burt E. Kennedy was an American football and basketball coach.

Early life
He was originally from Lake Forest, Illinois and graduated from Simpson College in Indianola, Iowa in 1904.

Olivet College
Kennedy served as the head football coach, head men's basketball coach, and athletic director at Olivet College in Olivet, Michigan for four years beginning in 1904.

Lake Forest College
He served as the head football coach and head men's basketball coach at Lake Forest College in Lake Forest, Illinois from 1908 to 1913.

References

19th-century births
20th-century deaths
Year of birth missing
Year of death missing
Olivet College alumni
Olivet Comets athletic directors
Olivet Comets football coaches
Olivet Comets men's basketball coaches
Lake Forest Foresters football coaches
Lake Forest Foresters men's basketball coaches
Simpson College alumni